The following is a list of episodes for the BET sitcom, Reed Between the Lines. The show debuted on October 11, 2011. The series follows a modern-day blended family as they navigate life’s ups and downs with wit and humor. It stars Tracee Ellis Ross and Malcolm-Jamal Warner as Dr. Carla and Alex Reed. All episode titles begin with "Let's Talk About..." before the subject presented in the episode.

The series was renewed for a second season on April 12, 2011. It was later announced in August 2012 that Tracee Ellis Ross would not return for the second season and three new cast members (Charlie Robinson, Michole White, and Tony Rock) would be joining the cast. On September 12, 2013, it was revealed that Reed Between the Lines has been canceled and that Young Man on Campus would not be green-lit to series. In December 2013, it was revealed by Malcolm-Jamal Warner that an entire second season had been shot, but won't be airing.

Series overview

Episodes

Season 1 (2011)

Season 2 (2015)

References

External links
 
 
List of Reed Between the Lines episodes on MSN TV
List of Reed Between the Lines episodes on TV Guide

Lists of American sitcom episodes